The 1981 Walker Cup, the 28th Walker Cup Match, was played on August 28 and 29, 1981, at Cypress Point Club, Pebble Beach, California. The event was won by the United States 15 to 9.

The United States led 8–4 after the first day but Great Britain and Ireland won 3 of the 4 second-day foursomes to reduce the American lead to 9–7. Although Roger Chapman beat Hal Sutton in the top singles match, the United States won 5 and halved the other 2 of the remaining 7 matches for a comfortable victory.

Format
The format for play on Friday and Saturday was the same. There were four matches of foursomes in the morning and eight singles matches in the afternoon. In all, 24 matches were played.

Each of the 24 matches was worth one point in the larger team competition. If a match was all square after the 18th hole extra holes were not played. Rather, each side earned ½ a point toward their team total. The team that accumulated at least 12½ points won the competition. If the two teams were tied, the previous winner would retain the trophy.

Teams
Ten players for the United States and Great Britain & Ireland participated in the event plus one non-playing captain for each team.

United States

Captain: Jim Gabrielsen
Ron Commans
Frank Fuhrer III
Jim Holtgrieve
Bob Lewis
Jodie Mudd
Corey Pavin
Joey Rassett
Jay Sigel
Hal Sutton
Dick von Tacky

Great Britain & Ireland
 & 
Captain:  Rodney Foster
 Roger Chapman
 Colin Dalgleish
 Peter Deeble
 Duncan Evans
 Geoffrey Godwin
 Ian Hutcheon
 Peter McEvoy
 Ronan Rafferty
 Philip Walton
 Paul Way

Friday's matches

Morning foursomes

Afternoon singles

Saturday's matches

Morning foursomes

Afternoon singles

References

Walker Cup
Golf in California
Walker Cup
Walker Cup
Walker Cup